Fate's Plaything is a 1920 Dutch-British silent drama film directed by Maurits Binger.

Cast
 Reginald Barton - Stephen Adams
 Constance Worth - Dolores Blockett
 Bruce Gordon - Dr. Lucas Murray
 Adelqui Migliar - Hugo Amadis
 Frank Dane - Charles Blackett
 Hector Abbas - Quentin Sylvester
 Henry Scofield - Blackett
 Harry Waghalter - Fane
 Henny Van Merle - Joyce Blackett
 Norman Doxat-Pratt - Peter
 Gwen Tremayne - Dolores als kind
 Fred Homann - Dokter
 Marie Spiljar
 Leni Marcus
 Frans Bogaert

External links 
 

1920 films
Dutch silent feature films
British silent feature films
British black-and-white films
Dutch black-and-white films
1920 drama films
Films directed by Maurits Binger
British drama films
Dutch drama films
1920s British films
Silent drama films